Valeria Masarsky, née Trifancova, (born June 1, 1979) is a former competitive figure skater for Latvia. She is a four-time Latvian national champion and qualified for the free skate at three ISU Championships – 1998 Europeans in Milan, Italy; 1999 Europeans in Prague, Czech Republic; and 1999 Worlds in Helsinki, Finland. She trained in Russia, in Riga, Latvia; and at the Oakton Ice Arena in Park Ridge, Illinois.

Programs

Competitive highlights

References 

1979 births
Latvian emigrants to the United States
Latvian female single skaters
Living people
Sportspeople from Riga